Megavision may refer to:
MegaVision, an American manufacturer of imaging systems
MEGA (Chilean TV channel) or Red Televisiva Megavisión 
Megavision is also a High Definition Multi-media Karaoke Player or Pro HDD Multi-media Karaoke Jukebox